Anthony Darcy (born 22 March 1972) is a former Australian rules footballer who played for Geelong, Footscray and St Kilda in the Australian Football League (AFL) during the 1990s.

Darcy, originally from Hampden Football League club Cobden, made just one appearance with Geelong in 1992. He was traded to Footscray and played 12 games in 1993, the closest he ever got to a full AFL season.

After only breaking into Footscray's seniors twice in 1994, one of those a Semi Final, Darcy spent the 1995 season at Port Adelaide in the South Australian National Football League. He had 36 disposals in their Grand Final win that year to claim the Jack Oatey Medal and on the back of this performance was lured back to the AFL by St Kilda, although he only added a further three games in 1996 to his AFL tally.

References

Holmesby, Russell and Main, Jim (2007). The Encyclopedia of AFL Footballers. 7th ed. Melbourne: Bas Publishing.

1972 births
Living people
Geelong Football Club players
Western Bulldogs players
St Kilda Football Club players
Port Adelaide Football Club (SANFL) players
Port Adelaide Football Club players (all competitions)
Cobden Football Club players
Australian rules footballers from Victoria (Australia)